Siassi Rural LLG is a local-level government (LLG) of Morobe Province, Papua New Guinea.

Wards
01. Lokep
02. Masele
03. Aimalu
04. Aupwel
05. Samanai
06. Semo
07. Pandamot
08. Tagop
09. Opai
10. Bunsil
11. Aronai
12. Malai
13. Tuam
14. Mandok
15. Giam
16. Gune
17. Lablab 1
18. Marile
19. Mabey
20. Movi

References

Local-level governments of Morobe Province